Khadeeja is a 1967 Indian Malayalam film, directed by M. Krishnan Nair and produced by Kalaratnam. The film stars Sathyan, Madhu, Sheela and Sukumari in the lead roles. The film had musical score by M. S. Baburaj.

Cast

Sathyan
Madhu
Sheela
Sukumari
Jayabharathi
Manavalan Joseph
Sebastian
Sreelatha Namboothiri
Baby Kumudam
Bahadoor
K. P. Ummer
Kaduvakulam Antony
Kamaladevi
Kottayam Chellappan
S. P. Pillai

Soundtrack
The music was composed by M. S. Baburaj and the lyrics were written by Yusufali Kechery.

References

External links
 

1967 films
1960s Malayalam-language films
Films directed by M. Krishnan Nair
Films scored by M. S. Baburaj